Yersinia vastinensis is a Gram-negative species of bacteria that has been isolated from human stools. All reported strains were isolated in France.

References

External links
LSPN lpsn.dsmz.de
Type strain of Yersinia vastinensis at BacDive -  the Bacterial Diversity Metadatabase

vastinensis
Bacteria described in 2020